Per Olof "Pelle" Harald Gedda (28 August 1914 – 4 July 2005) was a Swedish sailor who competed in the 1936 Summer Olympics and in the 1952 Summer Olympics. He was born in Västra Frölunda.

In 1936 he was a crew member of the Swedish boat Ilderim which finished fourth in the 8-metre class event.

Sixteen years later he won the silver medal as helmsman of the Swedish boat Tornado in the Dragon class. He died in Stockholm in 2005.

References

External links
 
 
 

1914 births
2005 deaths
Swedish male sailors (sport)
Olympic sailors of Sweden
Sailors at the 1936 Summer Olympics – 8 Metre
Sailors at the 1952 Summer Olympics – Dragon
Olympic silver medalists for Sweden
Olympic medalists in sailing
5.5 Metre class sailors
Medalists at the 1952 Summer Olympics
20th-century Swedish people
21st-century Swedish people